Miroir is the fourth studio album by Canadian singer Marie-Mai. The album was produced by Fred St-Gelais. Most of the French titles were recorded in the spring of 2012, with the exception of Sans Cri Ni Haine, which was released as a promotional single in France in February 2012. 3 of the songs (Young & Wired, Riptide and Heart Attack), were part of an English-language EP that was recorded in late 2010 but never released. Some French lines were added into "Heart Attack" during 2012 and despite Marie-Mai not being completely pleased with the results, it was included in the final track list as a special request from her mother, who loved the song.

Track listing

Personnel
 Marie-Mai – vocals, composer
 Fred St-Gelais – producer, guitar, bass, keyboard, percussion, drum, programming, mixing, mastering, arrangement
 John Nathaniel – production assistant, programming, digital publishing, composer, producer, mixing
 Maxime Lalanne – drum, programming
 Rob Wells – arrangement, composer, keyboard, programming
 Eric Speed – composer, producer, mixing, violin
 Robert Langlois – bass
 Étienne Ratthé – orchestration, cello
 Véronica Thomas – violin
 Pascale Gagnon – violin
 Ligia Paquin – alto

References 

Marie-Mai albums
2012 albums